Ridsport is a Swedish magazine about equestrianism and horse breeding. The magazine was founded in 1972 by Jan Bohlin, who is still the owner, and Ole Olson. The first issue appeared in November 1972. The Swedish Riding Sports Association is the publisher of the magazine. Three years later the magazine changed to a tabloid format and became a biweekly publication. Currently, 24 issues are published each year, with additional special issues.

Ridsport focuses on news reporting on equestrianism, in particular equestrian sports, and horse breeding, in Sweden and abroad. It also publishes feature articles, interviews and opinion pieces. The magazine's editorial board is located in Trosa, and it also employs a number of free-lancing writers around Sweden.

The magazine awards the Comet of the Year Award.

References

External links
 Official site 

1972 establishments in Sweden
Biweekly magazines published in Sweden
Equine magazines
Magazines established in 1972
Magazines published in Sweden
Swedish-language magazines